John A. O’Connell (June 13, 1919 - March 4, 2000) served in the California State Assembly for the 23rd district from 1955 to 1963. During World War II he served in the United States Army.

References

United States Army personnel of World War II
Democratic Party members of the California State Assembly
1919 births
2000 deaths
Politicians from Oakland, California